Podolanka is a municipality and village in Prague-East District in the Central Bohemian Region of the Czech Republic. It has about 600 inhabitants.

Geography
It lies in a flat agricultural landscape in the Central Elbe Table.

References

Villages in Prague-East District